Ruby Slippers, Golden Tears is the third book in a series of collections of re-told fairy tales edited by Ellen Datlow and Terri Windling.

Contents
Introduction – Terri Windling & Ellen Datlow
"Ruby Slippers" – Susan Wade – a re-telling of The Wizard of Oz from the perspective of a middle-aged Dorothy.
"The Beast" – Tanith Lee
"Masterpiece" – Garry Kilworth
"Summer Wind" – Nancy Kress
"This Century of Sleep or, Briar Rose Beneath the Sea" – Farida S. T. Shapiro – a re-telling of Sleeping Beauty, focusing on the transformations caused by time and waiting.
"The Crossing" – Joyce Carol Oates
"Roach in Loafers" – Roberta Lannes
"Naked Little Men" – Michael Cadnum
"Brother Bear" – Lisa Goldstein
"The Emperor Who Had Never Seen a Dragon" – John Brunner
"Billy Fearless" – Nancy A. Collins
"The Death of Koshchei the Deathless" – Gene Wolfe
"The Real Princess" – Susan Palwick
"The Huntsman's Story" – Milbre Burch
"After Push Comes to Shove" – Milbre Burch
"Hansel and Grettel" – Gahan Wilson
"Match Girl" – Anne Bishop
"Waking the Prince" – Kathe Koja
"The Fox Wife" – Ellen Steiber
"The White Road" – Neil Gaiman
"The Traveler and the Tale" – Jane Yolen
"The Printer's Daughter" – Delia Sherman

References

External links
Ellen Datlow's Bibliography
Rhiona's story-by-story description at Library Thing

1995 anthologies
Fantasy anthologies
Horror anthologies
Collections of fairy tales
William Morrow and Company books